Look was a biweekly, general-interest magazine published in Des Moines, Iowa, from 1937 to 1971, with editorial offices in New York City. It had an emphasis on photographs and photojournalism in addition to human interest and lifestyle articles.

Origin
Gardner "Mike" Cowles Jr. (1903–1985), the magazine's co-founder (with his brother John) and first editor, was executive editor of The Des Moines Register and The Des Moines Tribune. When the first issue went on sale in early 1937,  it sold 705,000 copies.

Although planned to begin with the January 1937 issue, the actual first issue of Look to be distributed was the February 1937 issue, numbered as Volume 1, Number 2. It was published monthly for five issues (February–May 1937), then switched to biweekly starting with the May 11, 1937 issue. Page numbering on early issues counted the front cover as page one. Early issues, subtitled Monthly Picture Magazine, carried no advertising.

The unusual format of the early issues featured layouts of photos with long captions or very short articles. The magazine's backers described it as "an experiment based on the tremendous unfilled demand for extraordinary news and feature pictures". It was aimed at a broader readership than Life, promising trade papers that Look would have "reader interest for yourself, for your wife, for your private secretary, for your office boy".

Highlights

From 1946 to 1970, Look published the Football Writers Association of America College All America Football Team and brought players and selected writers to New York City for a celebration. During that 25-year period, the FWAA team was introduced on national television shows by Bob Hope, Steve Allen, Perry Como, and others.

Its January 24, 1956, article "The Shocking Story of Approved Killing in Mississippi", included murder confessions from J. W. Milam and Roy Bryant, who had been acquitted in 1955 of killing 14-year-old boy Emmett Till.

Circulation peak

Within weeks of its debut, more than a million copies were bought of each issue, and it became a biweekly. By 1948, it sold 2.9 million copies per issue. Circulation reached 3.7 million in 1954, and peaked at 7.75 million in 1969. Its advertising revenue reached its highest point in 1966 at $80 million. Of the leading general-interest, large-format magazines, Look had a circulation second only to Life and ahead of The Saturday Evening Post, which closed in 1969, and Collier's, which folded in 1956.

Look was published under various company names: Look, Inc. (1937–45), Cowles Magazines (1946–65), and Cowles Communications, Inc. (1965–71). Its New York editorial offices were located in the architecturally distinctive 488 Madison Avenue, dubbed the "Look Building", now on the National Register of Historic Places.

KGB defector Yuri Bezmenov, regarding the October 1967 Russia Today issue, said: "From the first page to the last page, it was a package of lies: propaganda cliché[s] which were presented to American readers as opinions and deductions of American journalists. Nothing could be [further] from [the] truth." He goes on to explain exactly how the Look reporters were compromised.

Look ceased publication with its issue of October 19, 1971, the victim of a $5 million loss in revenues in 1970 (with television cutting deeply into its advertising revenues), a slack economy, and rising postal rates. Circulation was at 6.5 million when it closed.

Aftermath
French publisher Hachette brought back Look, the Picture Newsmagazine in February 1979 as a biweekly in a slightly smaller size. It lasted only a year. Subscribers received copies of Esquire to fulfill their terms.

The Look Magazine Photograph Collection was donated to the Library of Congress and contains about five million items.

After the closure, six Look employees created a fulfillment house using the computer system newly developed by the magazine's circulation department. The company, CDS Global, is now an international provider of customer relationship services.

Notable staff photographers and illustrators

Stanley Kubrick
Stanley Kubrick was a staff photographer for Look before starting his career in feature films. Of the more than 300 assignments Kubrick did for Look from 1946 to 1951, more than 100 are in the Library of Congress collection. All Look jobs with which he was associated have been cataloged with descriptions focusing on the images that were printed. Other related Kubrick material is located at the Museum of the City of New York.

Frank Bauman 
Frank Bauman was a staff photographer for Look following his career as war correspondent in World War II. Bauman worked alongside Margaret Bourke-White to document life in Cuba and the Soviet Union during the Cold War. Bauman was known for his experimental styles, and collaborated Doc Edgerton to develop the Stroboscopic effect, which proved that the Curveball curves, settling a longstanding dispute.

William Bradford Huie
Alabama journalist William Bradford Huie was commissioned by Look and other periodicals to write articles about the Civil Rights Movement in the South. In January 1956 he published an interview in Look in which two of the six white men who killed Emmett Till admitted their guilt and described their crime. They had been acquitted at trial several months previously by an all-white jury. His work for Look was criticized at the time as "checkbook journalism", because he was known to pay interviewees to speak with them.

James Karales
James Karales was a photographer for Look from 1960 to 1971. Covering the Civil Rights Movement throughout its duration, he took many memorable photographs, including the iconic photograph of the Selma to Montgomery march showing people proudly marching along the highway under a cloudy, turbulent sky.

Norman Rockwell 
Beginning in 1963, Norman Rockwell, after closing his career with the Saturday Evening Post, began making illustrations for Look.

See also
 List of defunct American periodicals
 Marjorie S. Deane
 Selected bibliography at Library of Congress

References

Further reading
 Cowles, Gardner. Mike Looks Back: The Memoirs of Gardner Cowles, Founder of Look Magazine. New York: G. Cowles, 1985.

External links

 Look collection in the Library of Congress.
 Cowles Family Publishing Legacy

1937 establishments in Iowa
1971 disestablishments in Iowa
Defunct magazines published in the United States
Magazines established in 1937
Magazines published in Iowa
Magazines disestablished in 1971
Mass media in Des Moines, Iowa
News magazines published in the United States
Photojournalistic magazines
Weekly magazines published in the United States